Surmiran (Surmiran, Vallader, Sutsilvan, Rumantsch Grischun: surmiran; Puter: surmiraun) is a dialect of the Romansh language. It is spoken in Surmeir and in the Albula Valley in the Grisons Canton, in Switzerland.

The "Hail Mary" in Surmiran 
Salidada seias te, Maria,
plagna da gratzga,
igl Signer è cun tè,
te ist la banadeida tranter las dunans,
e banadia è igl fretg digl ties best, Jesus.

Sontga Maria, mama da dia,
roia per nous putgants
ossa e sen l'oura da la nossa mort.
Amen.

References 

Romansh dialects